Luděk is a Czech masculine given name. It is the Czech short name of the Slavonic name Ludoslav or Ludomír, later becoming a proper name in its own right.

Pet form 
Ludia, Ludík, Ludo, Slávek, Slavo, Ludine

Famous bearers 
 Luděk Bohman - Czech athlete
 Luděk Bukač - Czech ice hockey player
 Luděk Hulan - Czech jazz bass player
 Luděk Kopřiva - Czech actor
 Luděk Krayzel - Czech ice hockey player
 Luděk Marold - Czech painter
 Luděk Mikloško - Czech football goalkeeper
 Luděk Munzar - Czech director, author and actor
 Luděk Nekuda - Czech moderator and musician
 Luděk Rubáš - Czech doctor and politician
 Luděk Sobota - Czech actor
 Luděk Vimr - Czech illustrator and graphic designer

External links 
 Luděk on Behind The Name

Czech masculine given names
Masculine given names